19th meridian may refer to:

19th meridian east, a line of longitude east of the Greenwich Meridian
19th meridian west, a line of longitude west of the Greenwich Meridian